Godfrey-Barnette House is a historic home located at Brevard, Transylvania County, North Carolina.  It was built about 1918, and is a -story, five bay, English Manorial Revival style stone dwelling with a modified T-plan.  It has a clipped gable roof, porch, and sun room.  Also on the property is a contributing stone fence.

It was listed on the National Register of Historic Places in 1993.

References

Houses on the National Register of Historic Places in North Carolina
Houses completed in 1918
Houses in Transylvania County, North Carolina
National Register of Historic Places in Transylvania County, North Carolina